Jana of the Jungle is an American animated television series created by comic strip artist Doug Wildey and produced by Hanna-Barbera Productions which aired on NBC from September 9 to December 2, 1978. It was originally broadcast as a half-hour segment of The Godzilla Power Hour (1978) and its later expanded form The Godzilla Super 90 (1978–79).

Overview
Jana (voiced by B.J. Ward) is essentially a female version of Tarzan who traveled to the rain forests of South America in search of her lost father (whom she never finds). Her father vanished in a boating accident when she was still a child, but the introduction shows that he survived. She is very beautiful, has long blonde hair, wears a dress made of unspecified animal skin and a necklace which doubles as a throwable weapon and makes a high-pitched resonating sound when thrown (somewhat similar to the chakram that would be the weapon of choice for the later, live-action Xena, Warrior Princess) given to her by her father before the boating accident. She also has a yell that is a slightly altered version of Tarzan’s which she uses to call many types of animals.

Besides her animal friends (Ghost, a sleek white jaguar and Tico, a pesky water opossum), Jana has two human friends: Dr. Ben Cooper (voiced by Michael Bell), a young wildlife biologist who maintained the preserve started by Jana's father and helped in her continuing search for her father; and Montaro (voiced by Ted Cassidy), a descendant of a lost warrior tribe armed with a supernatural weapon known as the Staff of Power that can cause earthquake shockwaves when it strikes the ground. Montaro rescued Jana from the boating accident in which her father disappeared.

These are some of the jungle animals Jana called to, many for help:
 Croco, a crocodile
 Kachi, a monkey
 Peechu, birds (parrots, macaws)
 Nacto, a bat
 Slithor, a snake

Episodes

Broadcast history
Jana of the Jungle was originally broadcast in these following formats on NBC:
 The Godzilla Power Hour (September 9, 1978 – October 28, 1978, NBC Saturday 9:30-10:30 AM)
 The Godzilla Super 90 (November 4, 1978 – September 1, 1979, NBC Saturday 9:00-10:30 AM)

A total of 13 original episodes of Jana of the Jungle were produced in 1978, with the first eight broadcast as part of the second half of The Godzilla Power Hour from September 9 to October 28. In November 1978, when The Godzilla Power Hour was expanded to 90 minutes (with the addition of Jonny Quest reruns) and re-titled The Godzilla Super 90, the five remaining episodes of Jana of the Jungle continued on this new format until December 2. The Jana character also made a cameo appearance piloting a rocket-car in an episode of Yogi's Space Race in 1978.

Jana of the Jungle resurfaced in 1985 as part of USA Cartoon Express which is the last time any of the original 13 episodes were shown on television. This is one of the very few Hanna-Barbera series that has yet to be seen on either Cartoon Network or Boomerang; however, one of the episodes, "The Cordillera Volcano", was available for a limited time on WB's Hanna-Barbera online stream.

Voices
 B.J. Ward as Jana
 Michael Bell as Dr. Ben Cooper
 Ted Cassidy as Montaro

Additional voices

 Marlene Aragon
 Bill Boyett
 Jeff David
 Virginia Eilea
 Ron Feinberg
 Jane James

 Casey Kasem
 Ross Martin
 Vic Perrin
 Barney Phillips
 Michael Rye
 Bill Woodson

Jana in comic books
In January 2007, Dynamite Entertainment launched a comic book, with plot by Frank Cho and script by Doug Murray, called Jungle Girl, featuring a blond female character called Jana. She is a Tarzan-esque heroine that lives in some kind of "Lost World", a jungle inhabited by strange creatures including dinosaurs and cavemen.  While bearing the same name and taking place in a jungle setting, the Cho/Murray comic character is not connected with the TV series, and wears a skimpier outfit.

References

External links
 
 Jana of the Jungle at the Big Cartoon DataBase (The Godzilla Power Hour)
 Jana of the Jungle at the Big Cartoon DataBase (The Godzilla Super 90)
 Jana of the Jungle at Toonarific Cartoons

1978 American television series debuts
1979 American television series endings
1970s American animated television series
American children's animated action television series
American children's animated adventure television series
American children's animated fantasy television series
NBC original programming
Jungle girls
Hanna-Barbera characters
Television series by Hanna-Barbera
Television series by Warner Bros. Television Studios